(Prop) Preller Geldenhuys was a pilot in the Rhodesian Air Force. He left Rhodesia (then Zimbabwe) in 1982 and began a new career in South Africa. After retiring, he became an author.

Air Force 

Geldenhuys joined the Royal Rhodesian Air Force in March 1962 as a general duties pilot on No 16 Pilot Training Course. After being awarded his Wings he was posted to No. 4 Squadron to fly Provost aircraft, then to No. 2 Squadron – Vampires, then No. 1 Squadron to fly Hunters FGA 9 aircraft, and then had a posting to No. 5 Squadron flying B2 and T4 Canberra bombers. Command appointments included Flight Commander on Hunters and Canberras, Officer Commanding Forward Air Field's FAF 2 Kariba and FAF 7 Buffalo Range, and Fire Force Charlie. 
Ground staff appointments included Officer Commanding Admin Wing, Thornhill, Staff Officer Volunteer Reserve and Staff Officer Personnel at Air Force Headquarters.

Later career 
After retiring from the Air Force, Geldenhuys joined hardboard manufacturer Masonite as a Personnel Superintendent, retiring as a Loss Control Manager after 20 years service. He emigrated to New Zealand in 2011 and enjoys managing Peysoft Publications, specialising in the formatting manuscripts for epub publication.

Published books

References

External links
Just Done Productions Publishing website

Rhodesian Air Force personnel
South African writers
South African non-fiction writers
White South African people
South African emigrants to Rhodesia
Foreign volunteers in the Rhodesian Security Forces
South African emigrants to New Zealand
1943 births
Place of birth missing (living people)
Living people